Audacity is Ugly Duckling's fourth studio album, which was released on January 12, 2009. It has a generally more melancholy feel than their previous, mostly upbeat work.

Track listing
"I Won't Let It Die" - 4:15
"The Takedown" - 3:52
"Audacity - Parts One and Two" - 5:03
"Falling Again" - 4:22
"It's Gone" - 3:47
"I Want To Believe" - 4:52
"Einstein Do It (Night on Scratch Mountain)" - 4:30
"The Lonely Ones" - 4:11
"Pay or Quit" - 1:34
"Right Now" - 4:27
"It Never Mattered" - 4:36
"Oh Yeah" - 3:54

References

External links
 Audacity album review on Style43.com

2009 albums
Fat Beats Records albums
Ugly Duckling (hip hop group) albums